The Battle of Tory Island (also known as the Battle of Donegal, Battle of Lough Swilly and Warren's Action) was a naval action fought on 12 October 1798 off the north coast of Ireland. The battle contested an attempted French invasion of Donegal in support of the Irish Rebellion of 1798, with a French squadron under Jean-Baptiste-François Bompart facing a hastily assembled Royal Navy blockade squadron under Sir John Borlase Warren. Bompart's force had been dispatched from Brest the month before with orders to reinforce a French army under Jean Humbert which had landed two months earlier.

Unbeknown to Bompart's force, Humbert's army and the rebellion as a whole had been defeated by the British Army a week before Bompart departed France. Bompart's squadron too was woefully understrength consisting of only a single ship of the line and eight frigates carrying 3,000 men. This small force faced a large proportion of the British Channel Fleet, which was prepared for a second invasion attempt after Humbert's army had landed unopposed in August. As a result, Bompart's force was spotted just a few hours after he left Brest and he was then chased into the Atlantic Ocean by several British frigates which followed him for a week until he was able to lose them in heavy weather. This weather persisted throughout the campaign, causing significant damage to both sides in a series of storms.

The delay caused by the pursuit of Bompart by the frigates under George Countess allowed the British to dispatch a more substantial squadron under Warren to the Donegal coast. Thus when Bompart arrived in the lee of Tory Island, he soon found himself threatened on all sides by a superior British force. Despite the damage his ships had suffered in the heavy weather conditions, Bompart attempted to escape but was swiftly run down and defeated in battle, his flagship and four frigates being captured and towed into Lough Swilly. Among the prisoners seized on board the flagship was Theobald Wolfe Tone, leader of the United Irishmen, whose capture and subsequent death signified the end of the rebellion. Over the next week, the scattered French survivors desperately attempted to reach the safety of French harbours in the face of dozens of British warships cruising along their homeward route. Only three made it, three others being hunted down and captured, one just a few miles from the entrance to Brest. The French never again attempted an invasion of Ireland.

Action of 12 October 1798

Action of 13 October 1798

Flight of Loire, 15–18 October 1798

Action of 20 October 1798

Savary's retreat, 28–30 October 1798

References

Key
 A † symbol indicates that the officer was killed during the action or subsequently died of wounds received.
 The ships are ordered in the sequence in which they formed up for battle.

Specific

General
 
 
 
 
 

French Revolutionary Wars orders of battle
Tory Island